"Call You Mine" is a song by American production duo The Chainsmokers featuring American singer-songwriter Bebe Rexha. It was released as a single on May 31, 2019, along with its music video, serving as the fourth single from the duo's third studio album World War Joy. "Call You Mine" marks The Chainsmokers' third collaboration with Bebe Rexha, following their remixes of "Take Me Home" by production trio Cash Cash, featuring Rexha on vocals, and their remix of her debut solo single, "I Can't Stop Drinking About You". Its music video won Best Dance Video at the 2019 MTV Video Music Awards.

Promotion
On May 28, 2019, both The Chainsmokers and Bebe Rexha shared a snippet of the music video, tagging each other and captioning it "Friday" and "FRIDAY 5/31", respectively.

Music video
The music video was directed by Dano Cerny. The music video is shown in reverse, and is about Rexha, implied to have stopped being a fan of the Chainsmokers, plotting the murder of them. She gives a sexy dance in a club, which the duo enjoys, then proceeds to poison their drinks before dragging them to her car and driving away from the cops.

Awards and nominations

Track listing

Charts

Weekly charts

Year-end charts

Decade-end charts

Certifications

Release history

References

2019 singles
2019 songs
The Chainsmokers songs
Bebe Rexha songs
Songs written by Andrew Taggart
Songs written by Alex Pall
Songs written by Andrew Watt (record producer)
Songs written by Ali Tamposi
Songs written by Norman Whitfield
Songs written by Steve Mac